Daniel M. Gallagher, Jr. (born May 31, 1972) is an American lawyer in private practice who served as a Commissioner of the U.S. Securities and Exchange Commission (SEC) from 2011 to 2015. Gallagher was appointed to the SEC by President Barack Obama. He also previously served as the deputy director and co-acting director of the Division of Trading and Markets.

Education
Gallagher graduated from Georgetown University in 1994 with a Bachelor of Arts in English and went on to receive a Juris Doctor from the Columbus School of Law at the Catholic University of America in 1998.

Professional career
Gallagher began his career in the private sector when he joined Wilmer, Cutler & Pickering (later WilmerHale) as an associate in the firm’s Securities Department. His next position took him to Fiserv Securities Inc. to serve as the company’s senior vice president and general counsel.

In 2006, Gallagher transitioned to the government sector and joined the SEC as counsel to former SEC Commissioner Paul S. Atkins and later as counsel to former Chairman Christopher Cox, working on matters involving the Division of Enforcement and the Division of Trading and Markets. In 2008, he became the deputy director of the Division of Trading and Markets and served as Division co-acting director from April 2009 through January 2010. Gallagher was appointed by Barack Obama and served as an SEC Commissioner from November 2011 to October 2015

After his time with the SEC, Gallagher returned to the private sector and in 2016 became president of Patomak Global Partners, a financial services consulting firm. He changed jobs in 2017 and joined global pharmaceutical company Mylan N.V. as the chief legal officer.

Gallagher rejoined WilmerHale in September 2019 where he serves as deputy chair of the firm’s Securities Department. His practice includes advising corporate boards and management on the full range of legal and strategic issues they face, and counseling financial services and accounting firms in investigations, regulatory proceedings and policy matters.

In May 2020, Robinhood announced that Gallagher would be joining the company as Chief Legal Officer.

Professional affiliations 
Gallagher serves on the boards of the National Association of Corporate Directors (NACD), a leading membership organization for corporate board directors, and Symbiont, a blockchain technology company developing products in smart contracts and distributed ledgers for use in capital markets; and Robinhood, a commission-free investing app. He was formerly a non-executive director of the Irish Stock Exchange.

He is also on the advisory boards for the Institute for Law and Economics at the University of Pennsylvania and the Center for Corporate Governance, part of the Raj & Kamla Gupta Governance Institute in Drexel University’s LeBow College of Business.

References

1972 births
Wilmer Cutler Pickering Hale and Dorr partners
Georgetown College (Georgetown University) alumni
Columbus School of Law alumni
Living people
Members of the U.S. Securities and Exchange Commission
Lawyers from Washington, D.C.
Obama administration personnel